Michael Ország de Gút was Palatine of the Kingdom of Hungary between 1458 and 1484.

Notes

Sources

1410s births
1484 deaths
Gutkeled (genus)
Palatines of Hungary
Masters of the doorkeepers
Royal treasurers (Kingdom of Hungary)
Masters of the stewards